Wilkes is the northeasternmost neighborhood in Portland, Oregon, bordered on the north by the Columbia River and on the east by the city of Gresham.  It adjoins the neighborhoods of Argay, Russell, and Hazelwood on the west, and Glenfair on the south.  Interstate 84 runs through the middle of the neighborhood.

History 
The Wilkes School property was donated by the Wilkes family. The Wilkes also settled Banks and Wilkesboro in the Dairy Creek area.  
The Wilkes were the family that Dr. John McLoughlin sent Noble Ellis up to Mt. Hood to rescue in the winter of 1847. The Wilkes Family Book "By an Oregon Pioneer Fireside" written by L. E. Wilkes is located in the Oregon State Legislative Library.
The first park established in the neighborhood was Wilkes Park. The land for the park was acquired in 1998 and the park was dedicated August 3, 2004. Since then, the city's parks department and its Bureau of Environmental Services partnered to acquire  of land at the headwaters of Wilkes Creek in March 2011 to create a second park and natural preservation area.

References

External links
Fairview-Rockwood-Wilkes Historical Society
Wilkes Community and Rockwood Corridor Plan (Portland Bureau of Planning, 1987)
Wilkes Street Tree Inventory Report

Neighborhoods in Portland, Oregon
Oregon populated places on the Columbia River